The 1999 Men's Hockey Asia Cup was the fifth tournament to date in Hockey Asia Cup for men. It was held from November 18 to November 28, 1999 in Kuala Lumpur, Malaysia. The winner of this tournament qualified for the 2002 Men's Hockey World Cup in Malaysia. South Korea defeated Pakistan 5-4 in the final to win their second title.

Results 
All times are (UTC+8).

Group stage

Pool A

Pool B

Finals

Semi-finals

Third and fourth place

Final

Final standings

References 

http://m.rediff.com/sports/asiacup99.htm

Hockey Asia Cup
1999 in Malaysian sport
1999 in field hockey
International field hockey competitions hosted by Malaysia
November 1999 sports events in Asia
Asia Cup